The Belarusian Orthodox Church (BOC;) is the official name of the Belarusian Exarchate of the Russian Orthodox Church in Belarus.
It represents the union of Russian Orthodox eparchies in the territory of Belarus and is the largest religious organization in the country, uniting the predominant majority of its Eastern Orthodox Christians.
 
Bishop Vienijamin (Vital Tupieka) became the Patriarchal Exarch of the Belarusian Orthodox Church in 2020.

The church enjoys a much lower degree of autonomy than the Ukrainian Orthodox Church of the Moscow Patriarchate, which is a semi-autonomous entity associated with the Russian Orthodox Church.

The Belarusian Orthodox Church strongly opposes the minor and largely emigration-based Belarusian Autocephalous Orthodox Church.

Structure
Structurally, the Belarusian Orthodox Church consists of 15 eparchies:

 Eparchy of Babruysk and Bykhau
 Eparchy of Barysaw
 Eparchy of Brest and Kobryn
 Eparchy of Hrodna and Vaukavysk
 Eparchy of Homel and Zhlobin
 Eparchy of Lida
 Eparchy of Minsk
 Eparchy of Mahiliou and Mstsislau
 Eparchy of Maladzyechna
 Eparchy of Navahrudak
 Eparchy of Pinsk and Luninets
 Eparchy of Polatsk and Hlybokaye
 Eparchy of Slutsk
 Eparchy of Turau and Mazyr
 Eparchy of Vitsebsk and Orsha

References

External links
 Official website
 The Growing Power Of The Belarusian Orthodox Church - Belarus Photo Digest

Eastern Orthodoxy in Belarus
Exarchates of the Russian Orthodox Church
Eastern Orthodox Church bodies in Europe